Marseille Cathedral (French: Cathédrale Sainte-Marie-Majeure de Marseille or Cathédrale de la Major) is a Roman Catholic cathedral, and a national monument of France, located in Marseille. It has been a basilica minor since 1896. It is the seat of the Archdiocese of Marseille (formerly the Diocese of Marseille until its elevation in 1948).

Old cathedral
Part of the earlier, much smaller cathedral still remains, alongside the new cathedral. It was built in the 12th century in a simple Romanesque style. The eclectic style is characteristic of the 19th century. Two bays of the nave were demolished in the 1850s, when the new cathedral was built. What remains is the choir and one bay of the nave. It is commonly referred to as the "Vieille Major". The composer Charles Desmazures was organist at the old cathedral.

New cathedral
The present cathedral, the "Nouvelle Major", was built on an enormous scale in the Byzantine and Roman Revival styles. The foundation stone was laid by Emperor Napoleon III in 1852 and the first service was held in 1893. It was completed in 1896, given the title of minor basilica, and consecrated in 1897. It was built on the site used for the cathedrals of Marseille since the fifth century, principally by the architects Léon Vaudoyer and Henri-Jacques Espérandieu (1829-1874). It is 142 meters (469 ft) long, and the main cupola is 70 meters (231 ft) high. With a capacity of 3,000 seats, it is one of the largest cathedrals in France. It is a listed monument since 1906.

Gallery

See also
 This cathedral should not be confused with the more famous basilica of Notre-Dame de la Garde, also in Marseille.
 List of works by Eugène Guillaume
List of works by Louis Botinelly

References

External links

 Ministère de la Culture: Archive photographs of the new cathedral

2nd arrondissement of Marseille
Roman Catholic churches in Marseille
Basilica churches in France
Churches completed in 1896
19th-century Roman Catholic church buildings in France
Tourist attractions in Marseille
Byzantine Revival architecture in France
Roman Catholic cathedrals in France
Church buildings with domes